15 ATV is a television station broadcasting to the island of Aruba, broadcasting on channel 15 on SETAR's cable TV system and VHF channel 8 on analog terrestrial television in the NTSC television standard. The station has the call sign of PJA-TV (following the standard in the Netherlands and Netherlands Antilles, with PJ call signs), though it goes by its branding of "ATV". The station is affiliated with the NBC television network, the only one not located in the United States (following the 2014 closure of VSB-TV in Bermuda), airing many American television programs for the tourists in the area, with programming from the network's flagship station WNBC in New York City during prime time and overnight hours. 15 ATV also broadcasts several local productions, including Noticia Awenochi, Time Out, Mesa Rondo, 15 on 15, Pulso Latino, Trend Alert, Stylish Living and live coverage of events and breaking news.

15 ATV's studios are located at Royal Plaza Mall in downtown Oranjestad.

See also 
Telearuba
TeleCuraçao
RTV-7

External links 
Official website

Television stations in Aruba
NBC network affiliates
Transnational network affiliates